The Bakerton Group is the debut full-length studio album by American instrumental rock band The Bakerton Group. It was released in 2007 and contains eight tracks with a running time of over half an hour. Mick Schauer, who first joined Clutch in 2005, was also enlisted to The Bakerton Group as organist. The album design and artwork was done by Eno Kalkin.

Track listing

Personnel 
 Tim Sult – guitar
 Dan Maines – bass
 Jean-Paul Gaster – drums
 Mick Schauer – keyboards
 J. Robbins – producer (recording and mixing)

References 

2007 debut albums
The Bakerton Group albums
Albums produced by J. Robbins